The Grace Church in Clarkesville, Georgia, also known as Grace-Calvary Episcopal Church, was built in 1839.  It was listed on the National Register of Historic Places in 1980.

It was designed and built in Greek Revival style by local master builder Jarvis Van Buren.  It has mortise and tenon framing.

While it was separately listed on the National Register in 1980, it is also included as a contributing building in the National Register-listed Washington-Jefferson Street Historic District.

References

Episcopal church buildings in Georgia (U.S. state)
National Register of Historic Places in Habersham County, Georgia
Greek Revival architecture in Georgia (U.S. state)
Churches completed in 1839